Chotoviny is a municipality and village in the Tábor District in the South Bohemian Region of the Czech Republic. It has about 1,800 inhabitants.

Administrative parts
Villages of Beranova Lhota, Broučkova Lhota, Červené Záhoří, Jeníčkova Lhota, Liderovice, Moraveč, Polánka, Řevnov, Rzavá, Sedlečko and Vrážná are administrative parts of Chotoviny.

Geography

It lies mostly in the Vlašim Uplands. There are several small ponds in the territory.

History
The first written mention of Chotoviny is from 1266. Existence of a fortress in Chotoviny is documented in 1407. From 1856 to 1871, the railway from Prague to Vienna through Chotoviny was built.

Transport
The D3 motorway runs through the municipality.

Sights
In 1770–1780, the fortress in Chotoviny was rebuilt to a Neoclassical castle. It is dendrologically valuable.

A church was probably founded here already between 990 and 1000. The Church of Saints Peter and Paul was built originally in the Gothic style and was rebuilt in 1781–1786, when the Empire tomb of the Nádherný noble family in the style of a Doric temple was added.

References

External links

Villages in Tábor District